Brahms: The Boy II is a 2020 American supernatural horror film starring Katie Holmes, Ralph Ineson, Christopher Convery and Owain Yeoman. A sequel to the 2016 film The Boy, it is directed by William Brent Bell and written by Stacey Menear, the respective director and writer of the original film.

Brahms: The Boy II follows a young boy who, after moving into a mansion with his parents following a traumatizing incident, finds a lifelike doll he becomes attached to. It was released in the United States by STX Entertainment on February 21, 2020, and was panned by critics, many of whom deemed it inferior to its predecessor. The film was also a financial disappointment, grossing $20million worldwide against a budget of $10 million plus advertising costs, less than a third of the first film's gross.

Plot
Liza and her son Jude survive a home invasion by two masked men, but are left traumatized by the event. Liza is plagued by nightmares while Jude develops mutism, and is left communicating through a notepad. Liza's husband, Sean, suggests they relocate to the countryside to recuperate. The family move to a manor, unaware of its dark history.

Arriving at the manor house, they explore the property and Jude finds a porcelain doll buried in the ground. Liza and Sean explore a nearby mansion. Realizing that Jude is missing, Liza searches for him and finds him in possession of the doll. Encouraged by Jude's connection to it, Liza cleans-off "Brahms," making the doll look new.

The next day, Liza and Jude take a walk around the property at Jude's request. They meet Joseph, the property caretaker, and his dog. Tensions fray when Sean urges Liza to talk about the events of the burglary, and she will not.

Back in the house, Liza and Sean overhear Jude talking in his room. They ask if he is talking to Brahms and Jude writes 'yes' in his notepad. Weird events occur around the house, and Sean and Liza discuss a change in Jude's behaviour with their therapist.

Joseph talks to Jude about his dog being missing, but no one appears to have seen the dog. Liza finds disturbing pictures, and assumes they have been drawn by Jude. Later that evening, the family has dinner and Jude writes in his notepad that Brahms' plate is missing. Liza, upset about earlier, says that Brahms does not eat because he is a doll. She and Sean argue in the kitchen and Sean leaves the room. She goes to sit with Jude at the table and tells him that he needs to stay at the table until he eats. He writes on his notepad that she is making Brahms mad. She leaves the dining room and hears a loud noise. She and Sean run into the room, finding the dining room table and chairs overturned. Jude, scared, wrote that he told Liza not to make Brahms mad. Arguing about Brahms and Jude, Sean and Liza disagree about the mysterious things that are happening.

Jude leaves for the nearby mansion with Brahms in hand, leaving a note that reads 'You should have followed the rules'. Joseph finds Sean and Liza in the mansion and tells them briefly about a family that had lived there prior. He says that a boy named Brahms had lived there; he had killed two people, and did not leave the mansion for 30 years.

Shortly after, Sean's brother and his family come to visit. Will, Jude's cousin, gets mysteriously injured during the visit. Liza becomes even more upset. Liza later hits Joseph in the head, and she begs to know where Jude is. Joseph tells her that it will be over soon and that "Brahms and Jude are gonna be one". She gets loose and goes to look for Jude in the mansion.

Sean finds Liza and Jude in the basement and hits Brahms with a croquet mallet, revealing a demonic, rotting area under his face. Joseph then starts to get scared and says that "It will never be over" and that Brahms will take out the family's failure to "follow the rules" on him. A furnace then explodes, killing Joseph but leaving the family unharmed. Jude grabs Brahms, and throws him into the fire.

Liza, Sean and Jude are soon back at their home in the city, and everything seems normal. However, when he is left alone in his room, Jude walks over to his dresser and puts on a porcelain mask. He wishes Brahms a good night, and says that everything will be fine if his family follows the rules.

Cast
 Katie Holmes as Liza
 Owain Yeoman as Sean
 Christopher Convery as Jude
 Ralph Ineson as Joseph
 Anjali Jay as Dr. Lawrence
 Oliver Rice as Liam
 Natalie Moon as Pamela
 Daphne Hoskins as Sophie
 Joely Collins as Mary

Production

By October 2018, it was announced that a sequel was in development, with Katie Holmes joining the cast of the film, William Brent Bell returning to direct and Stacey Menear back to write the script of the film, respectively, with Matt Berenson, Gary Lucchesi, Tom Rosenberg, Jim Wedaa and Eric Reid serving as producers, under their Lakeshore Entertainment banners, and STX Entertainment producing and distributing the film.

In November 2018, Christopher Convery, Ralph Ineson and Owain Yeoman also joined the cast of the film.

Principal photography began in January 2019 and wrapped that March. Parts of the sequel were filmed in Victoria on Vancouver Island, located in British Columbia, Canada.

Release
The film was theatrically released in the United States on February 21, 2020. It was previously scheduled for July 26, 2019, and then December 6, 2019.

Reception

Box office
Brahms: The Boy II grossed $12.6million in the United States and Canada, and $7.7million in other territories, for a worldwide total of $20.3million, against a production budget of $10million.

In the United States and Canada, the film was released alongside The Call of the Wild and Impractical Jokers: The Movie as well as the wide expansion of The Lodge, and was projected to gross $5–8million from 2,151 theaters in its opening weekend. The film made $2.2million on its first day, including $375,000 from Thursday night previews. It went on to debut to $5.7million, finishing fifth at the box office. In its second weekend the film dropped 55% to $2.6million, finishing sixth.

Critical response
The site's critics consensus reads: "More likely to induce boredom than quicken the pulse, Brahms: The Boy II is chiefly scary for the way it undermines the effectiveness of its above-average predecessor." On Metacritic, the film has a weighted average score of 29 out of 100, based on 13 critics, indicating "generally unfavorable reviews." Audiences polled by CinemaScore gave the film an average grade of "C−" on an A+ to F scale, and PostTrak reported it received an average 1 out of 5 stars from viewers they polled, with 24% of people saying they would definitely recommend it.

Benjamin Lee, writing for The Guardian, gave the film one star out of five, describing it as "so punishingly dull to watch, filled with dry, perfunctory dialogue from Stacey Menear's consistently uninventive script and shot without even a glimmer of style," adding that "even at a brisk 86 minutes, it feels like unending torture..." with a finale "that buckles under the weight of its own stupidity, as well as some god-awful CGI."

Accolades
Katie Holmes was nominated at the Golden Raspberry Awards as Worst Actress (for her appearance in  this movie and also in The Secret: Dare to Dream).

Possible sequel

In August 2022, Bell stated that he has plans for a third installment. The filmmaker stated that his intentions are to round out the character of Brahms, with the completion of a trilogy. While the second film centered around the porcelain doll "Brahms", the potential next movie would once again continue the story of the character from the original release. Later that month, Bell expounded on his ideas for potential future installments including a sequel and possible prequel options. When discussing the future of the series, the filmmaker stated that had Jason Blum collaborated on the movies, the third installment would have been released by the time the second was. Bell continued that the next movie will reveal that Brahms Heelshire survived the events at the end of the first installment, and that it will reveal what he has been up to; while expressing plans for the character and his doll counterpart to appear in the film. He stated: "...there’s a lot of great stories and there’s prequels. ...[It's a] rich world that lends itself to a lot."

References

External links
 
 
 

2020 films
2020 horror films
American horror films
2020s English-language films
Fictional dolls and dummies
Films about dolls
Films directed by William Brent Bell
Films produced by Gary Lucchesi
Films produced by Roy Lee
Films produced by Tom Rosenberg
Films scored by Brett Detar
Films set in country houses
Lakeshore Entertainment films
STX Entertainment films
2020s American films
Horror films about toys